Oaklawn Academy is a boarding school. It was founded by the Legion of Christ.

Originally situated in Cheshire, Connecticut, the academy moved, in 1986, to Edgerton, Wisconsin, in a rural area on the shore of Lake Koshkonong, 25 miles from Madison, Wisconsin, and approximately two hours north of Chicago.

The campus is located just off Interstate 90.

External links 
 Official website

Educational institutions established in 1984
Private schools in Wisconsin
Boarding schools in Wisconsin
Regnum Christi
Legion of Christ
1984 establishments in Connecticut
1986 establishments in Wisconsin